This is a list of individual caskets with articles:

Shinkot casket, 2nd century BC, Buddhist container for reliquaries, Gandhara, stone
Bajaur casket, 5–6 AD, Gandhara (now Pakistan), stone reliquary
Kanishka Casket, 127, Kushan Empire (now Pakistan), gilded copper reliquary
Bimaran casket, 1st century, Afghanistan, gold reliquary
Brescia Casket, late 4th century, Italy, ivory reliquary
Pyxis of Čierne Kľačany, perhaps 4th-century, Byzantine, ivory
Franks Casket, early 8th century, Northumbria (now Northern England and south-east Scotland), bone (whale)
Pyxis of Zamora, 964, Islamic Spain, ivory 
Pyxis of al-Mughira, 968, Islamic Spain, ivory
Troyes Casket, 10th or 11th century, Byzantine (found in France), ivory
Veroli Casket, late 10th or early 11th century, Constantinople (now known as Istanbul), ivory
Cammin Casket, Scandinavia (lost in the Second World War of 1939–1945, although copies and a plaster cast remain), metal reliquary
Leyre Casket, 1004–1005, Caliphate of Córdoba, Islamic Spain, ivory
Uttoxeter Casket, Anglo-Saxon England, wood
Morgan Casket, 11th–12th centuries, Southern Italy, ivory
Becket Casket, 1180–1190, France, metal chasse reliquary
Casket of Saint Cugat, early 14th century, Catalonia (now Spain), metal
Casket with Scenes of Romances (Walters 71264), 1330–1350, France, ivory
Noli me tangere casket, 1356, Germany
Royal Casket, 1800, Poland, wood with metal fittings

See also
Chasse (casket)
Pyxis (vessel), round form
Pyx (for Eucharist), typically round form

Reliquaries
Caskets